The left-to-right mark (LRM) is a control character (an invisible formatting character) used in computerized typesetting (including word processing in a program like Microsoft Word) of text containing a mix of left-to-right scripts (such as Latin and Cyrillic) and right-to-left scripts (such as Arabic, Syriac, and Hebrew). It is used to set the way adjacent characters are grouped with respect to text direction.

Unicode 

In UTF-8 it is E2 80 8E. Usage is prescribed in the Unicode Bidi (bidirectional) algorithm.

Example of use in HTML
Suppose the writer wishes to use some English text (a left-to-right script) into a paragraph written in Arabic or Hebrew (a right-to-left script) with non-alphabetic characters to the right of the English text. For example, the writer wants to translate, "The language C++ is a programming language used..." into Arabic. Without an LRM control character, the result looks like this:

لغة C++ هي لغة برمجة تستخدم...

With an LRM entered in the HTML after the ++, it looks like this, as the writer intends:

لغة C++‎ هي لغة برمجة تستخدم...

In the first example, without an LRM control character, a web browser will render the ++ on the left of the "C" because the browser recognizes that the paragraph is in a right-to-left text (Arabic) and applies punctuation, which is neutral as to its direction, according to the direction of the adjacent text. The LRM control character causes the punctuation to be adjacent to only left-to-right text – the "C" and the LRM – and position as if it were in left-to-right text, i.e., to the right of the preceding text.

Some software requires using the HTML code &#8206; or &lrm; instead of the invisible Unicode control character itself . Using the invisible control character directly could also make copy editing difficult.

See also
 Right-to-left mark
 Bidirectional text

References

External links
 Unicode standard annex #9: The bidirectional algorithm
 Unicode character (U+200E)

Control characters
Digital typography
Unicode formatting code points